Archers Bay (1995–2002) was a Canadian Thoroughbred racehorse known for winning the first two legs of the 1998 Canadian Triple Crown. He was sired by Silver Deputy and out of the stakes-winning mare, Adorned, a daughter of the 1975 French Derby winner, Val de l'Orne.

In the 1998 Canadian Triple Crown series, Archers Bay won the Queen's Plate and the Prince of Wales Stakes but did not run in the final leg as the Breeders Stakes is a test on turf. He was voted Canadian Champion Three-Year-Old Male Horse.

Retired to stud duty, Archers Bay sired Arch Hall and other foals.

The stallion was humanely euthanized in 2002 after an unsuccessful colic surgery and is buried on his farm.

References

1995 racehorse births
2002 racehorse deaths
Racehorses bred in Canada
Racehorses trained in Canada
Racehorses trained in the United States
King's Plate winners
Sovereign Award winners
Thoroughbred family 11-c